Tanis is an archaeological site in Egypt, and the location of a city of the same name.

Tanis may also refer to:

Places
Tanis, Manche, France
Tanis, Wiltshire, England
Tanis (fossil site), in North Dakota, U.S.

People
 Tanis (musician) (Tanis Chalopin, born 1993), French-Singaporean singer-songwriter
 Tanis (given name), including a list of people with the name
 Farah Tanis (fl. from 1993), American feminist activist 
 James Tanis (born 1965), Papua New Guinean politician
 Fırat Tanış (born 1975), Turkish actor
 Umut Taniş (born 2004), Turkish footballer

Fictional entities
 Tanis Half-Elven, a character in the Dragonlance novels
 Tanis, a character in "Cold Fire" (Star Trek: Voyager)
 Tanis, a character in Scooby-Doo and the Ghoul School
 Tanis, a planet in Pandorum
 Tanis, a character in Letterkenny

Other uses
 Tanis (podcast), a mystery horror podcast
 Bishop of Tanis

See also 
 
 
 Tanish, an Indian actor